El vagabundo (English title:The tramp) is a Mexican telenovela produced and directed by for Telesistema Mexicano.

Cast 
Augusto Benedico
Silvia Derbez
Sonia Furió
Pilar Jordan
Gloria Jordán
Enrique Lizalde
Patricia de Morelos
Claudio Obregón

References 

Mexican telenovelas
1971 telenovelas
Televisa telenovelas
Spanish-language telenovelas
1971 Mexican television series debuts
1971 Mexican television series endings